Roberto Criscuolo (born 21 February 1997) is an Italian football player. He plays for Audace 1919.

Club career
He made his professional debut in the Serie B for Latina on 27 August 2016 in a game against Hellas Verona F.C.

References

External links
 

1997 births
People from Palestrina
Living people
Italian footballers
Association football midfielders
Latina Calcio 1932 players
S.S. Arezzo players
Serie B players
Serie C players
F.C. Rieti players
Footballers from Lazio
Sportspeople from the Metropolitan City of Rome Capital